Silvinit is a Russian company involved in the production of mineral fertilizes. The company delivers its products to all regions of Russia and to over more than 50 countries worldwide, including Brazil, China, India, United States, East-South Asia and Latin America, among others. It manages its activities through two branches, one in Belarus and one in Germany. Silvinit operates through eight affiliated companies and eight subsidiaries.

In December 2010, Uralkali announced plans to buy Silvinit  for $7.8 billion in cash and shares. The merger was approved in February 2011 and finalized in July that same year. Together they form one of the world's largest potash producers.

References

External links 
 Official site

Chemical companies of Russia
Companies based in Perm Krai
Russian brands